TO-126 is a type of semiconductor package for devices with three pins, such as transistors.  The package is rectangular with a hole in the middle to allow for easy mounting to a board or a heat sink. On one side of the package typically a metal sheet is exposed, with the transistor die bonded to the other side of the metal sheet inside the package. This allows for an efficient heat transfer from the transistor die to an external heat sink but also implies that the metal sheet is electrically connected to the die (for a bipolar junction transistor usually the collector is connected to this metal sheet).

History and origin
The JEDEC TO-126 descriptor is derived from the original full name for the package: Transistor Outline Package, Case Style 126. In the updated JEDEC outline system, the package is numbered as TO-225AA.

STMicroelectronics refers to this package style as SOT-32.

National Standards

See also
 TO-66, a metal package with similar power ratings
 TO-220, a plastic package with higher power ratings

References

External links
 TO-126 Package, EESemi.com

Semiconductor packages